Aronimink Golf Club is a private country club in the eastern United States, located in Newtown Square, Pennsylvania, a suburb west of Philadelphia. Its championship layout is consistently rated among the nation's top golf courses. Aronimink is currently ranked 78th in Golf Digest's "Greatest Courses," 44th in "Toughest Courses" and 55th in Golfweek's "Classic Courses." In 2010, Aronimink was ranked #4 among the toughest courses on the PGA Tour by Links magazine. 

The club has been host to multiple USGA and PGA championships in its history. Additionally, Aronimink has indoor and outdoor tennis and paddle courts, trap shooting, three swimming pools, a fitness center and a classic Tudor clubhouse with multiple dining options.

History 

The club's roots can be traced to 1896 when the Royal and Ancient game made its way to America and the Belmont Golf Association (BGA), the forerunner of the Aronimink Golf Club, spun off from the Belmont Cricket Club. A year later, the Belmont Golf Association teamed up with Philadelphia Country Club, Merion Cricket Club and Philadelphia Cricket Club to form the Golf Association of Philadelphia, the first sectional golf association in the United States. By 1897 the BGA had a full nine holes in play at 52nd Street and Chester Avenue, its first location, in what is today Southwest Philadelphia. Playing to a length of 3,070 yards, par for the course was established at 36½. In that same year, the BGA was the first and only founding club to host its own championship. The tournament was won by Hugh Wilson who designed Merion's golf courses.

History has it that Aronimink was named after the chief of the Lenape tribe who once occupied the small farmhouse being used as the original clubhouse. From inception to the mid-1920s, as the City of Philadelphia continued to expand, Aronimink operated from three different sites. Finally, in 1926 the club sold its Drexel Hill location and purchased a large  tract in Newtown Square,  from the center of Philadelphia.  

Scottish-born Donald Ross, at the time one of the country's most respected golf course architects, was commissioned to design the new course, which opened for play on Memorial Day in 1928. The greens, fairways and hazards of his championship course design are the same today as they were in 1928. The Club's impressive British-inspired clubhouse was designed by architects Charles Barton Keen and Franklin D. Edmonds, a member of the club. 

Aronimink has been home to many accomplished golfers in its history.  The first American-born winner of the U.S. Open, John McDermott, was an Aronimink caddie who learned to play golf from Aronimink's longtime head golf professional, Walter Reynolds.  Notable members from the modern era of golf include: Gary Player (an honorary member since 2003), Sean O'Hair (PGA professional and home-town favorite) and Jay Sigel (the distinguished amateur and senior professional golfer). Currently, Aronimink's head golf professional is Jeff Kiddie.

Aronimink gained media notoriety when it withdrew itself from plans to host the 1993 PGA Championship because it didn't have any current or prospective African-American members or applicants before the start of the tournament. The club has since met all of the PGA's minority membership requirements and has hosted both a Senior PGA and a USGA event since 1993, with the Women's PGA scheduled in October 2020.

Golf course: design and layout 

Aronimink embodies many of the principles that guided Donald Ross's approach to golf course design, which was rooted in the linksland golf of his native Scotland. To Ross it was important that the lay of the land have an effect on the ball being played – adding an element of chance to the game and enhancing the golfer's sense of excitement and anticipation. He incorporated hazards to present challenges and risks, and to protect par he was particularly clever around the greens with his bunkering and designs for the greens, which offered numerous challenging pin positions.   

In 2003, Ron Prichard, a noted golf architect from the Philadelphia area and the foremost authority on Ross's design philosophy, completed a restoration project at Aronimink that recaptured classic Ross features that had been diminished and/or lost over time.  Panoramic views were restored by eliminating overplanting. Based on Ross's original drawings for the course, greens were restored to their original shapes and sizes, and his unique bunkering style was reestablished.  Length was added to neutralize the effect technology has had on golf and brought Ross's unique design features back into play in quite an effective fashion.

With the restoration, Donald Ross's Aronimink plays as he intended it to.  As he said in 1948, two decades after the course opened, "I intended to make this my masterpiece, but not until today did I realize built better than I knew."  

Ross's design rewards well executed shots and strategy for golfers at all skill levels. Framed by hardwoods and evergreens, the course is a test of long-hole and short-hole skills, as well as the execution of sound course management. With 75 bunkers and numerous slopes, valleys and doglegs, the course tests a player's patience and endurance. Ross meant Aronimink to be a “supreme test” for the best golfers.

Aronimink's opening hole is one of the most memorable in golf. The intimidating first hole plunges down into a valley, then rises steeply, playing long and uphill to a well-guarded undulating green.  

On the front nine there are a number of challenging doglegs, particularly the par four #7. Although not a long hole, the approach must carry a yawning bunker guarding the front of a green with several difficult pin locations. Then there is #8, perhaps the hardest par three on the course, playing  downhill to a narrow green bisected by a large mound.  

The turn for home at Aronimink begins with #10, a  par four that is considered by many the most demanding on the course.  The narrow fairway is guarded by a bunker on the right and deep rough on the left. A successful approach shot must avoid the water hazard protecting the front left of the sharply terraced green.

In 2003, John Jacobs birdied the last two holes to win the Senior PGA Championship. The 17th is a  par three. An errant tee shot often finds the lake guarding the green. The finishing hole is a  uphill par four, requires a precise tee shot and the approach shot is to a winding and sloped green with a numerous challenging pin locations.

Past and future tournaments 

When the PGA Championship was held at Aronimink in 1962, Gary Player prevailed as he posted a score of 278 (−2). In 1977, John Fought needed only 28 holes to win the final match in the U.S. Amateur – 9 & 8 – over Doug Fischesser. In the 1997 U.S. Junior Amateur, Jason Allred defeated Trevor Immelman in the final match, one-up. In 2003, John Jacobs won the Senior PGA Championship with a score 276 (−4). Justin Rose won the 2010 AT&T National with a final score of 270 (−10), after needing pars at both the 71st and 72nd holes to win. Nick Watney defeated the field with a bogey-free round on Sunday – after setting the course record of 62 (−8) on Saturday – for a score of 267 (−13).

Scorecard

References

External links

Golf Association of Philadelphia (GAP)
Golf Link: Aronimink Golf Club
2010 AT&T National Video Recap – Narrated by Jim Nantz
2011 AT&T National Video Recap

Golf clubs and courses in Pennsylvania
Golf clubs and courses designed by Donald Ross
Buildings and structures in Delaware County, Pennsylvania
Sports venues completed in 1896
1896 establishments in Pennsylvania